Year of Desolation is an American metal band formed in Indiana in 2001. They are influenced by classic rock and heavy metal, and have year and years of touring under their belts. They have four releases, with a critically acclaimed release on Prosthetic Records with a video for the song "Suffer Thy Nemesis" on YouTube.

Members

Current members 
Chad Zimmerman – vocals (2001)
Matt Behner – drums (2006–present)
Josh Kappel – guitar (2004–present)
John M Hehman II – guitar (2001)
Mike Vandegriff – bass (2004–present)

Former members 
Jason Connors – drums (2001)
David Bailey – drums (2001–2002)
Joey Roberts – drums (2002–2003)
Chad Beber – bass (2002–2004)
Mike Collier – guitar (2002–2004)
Ryan Green – guitar (2004)
Jason Carr – drums (2003–2005)
Jake Omen – drums (2005–2006)
Matt McCutcheon – drums (2006)
Matthew Behner – drums (2006, 2007–present)
Mike Vandegriff – bass (2004–2007–present)
Steve Spitzbart – drums (2007)
Brandon Lytle – bass (2007–2008)

Discography 
The Dirty 30 vs. The Donkey Punch (EP, 2002)
Your Blood, My Vendetta (album, 2004)
Winter (demo, 2005)
Year of Desolation (CD, Prosthetic, 2007)

Notes

References

External links 
 Year of Desolation at Prosthetic Records

Musical groups from Indianapolis
Heavy metal musical groups from Indiana
Musical quintets
Musical groups established in 2001